Mei Xiang (Chinese 美香 Měi Xiāng  "beautiful fragrance") is a female giant panda who lives at the National Zoo in Washington D.C.

Mei Xiang has given birth to seven cubs, all at the National Zoo and fathered by Tian Tian. Four of her cubs have survived to adulthood. Mei Xiang's most recent cub is a male, named Xiao Qi Ji, born on August 21, 2020.

Background
Mei Xiang was born on July 22, 1998, at the China Conservation and Research Center for the Giant Panda in Wolong, Sichuan Province; she weighs about 230 pounds. Her mother was Xue Xue and her father was Lin Nan; both parents were wild pandas. She and Tian Tian, a male, are the National Zoo's second pair of giant pandas.

Giant pandas are thought to be solitary creatures, except for mating season and mothers with young cubs. In keeping with the habits of wild pandas, Mei is generally alone, although Mei and Tian are occasionally together outside of breeding season. Tian and Mei are trained to participate in a full medical examination, including a blood draw, without anesthesia.

Motherhood

Mei Xiang has given birth to seven cubs. Tai Shan, a male, was born July 9, 2005. He was the first panda cub to be born at the zoo and live for more than a few days. He lived at the zoo until February 4, 2010, when he moved to China, as per an agreement between the United States and China.

Mei Xiang was artificially inseminated twice in April 2012 with Tian Tian's sperm. Zoo officials estimated her chances of pregnancy at 10% after she had previously had five false pregnancies, in which she acted pregnant but was not.  Another cub was born on the night of September 16, 2012, and was a surprise to zookeepers. As of September 17, zoo officials did not know the sex of the cub. The cub, whom officials believed to have been a female, was found deceased on September 23, 2012 after Mei Xiang expressed distressed, honking-like sounds. Initial findings from the necropsy ruled out the possibility that it could have been crushed by Mei Xiang. However, it showed fluid in the giant panda cub's abdomen (which is usually abnormal), and some discoloration of some of the liver tissue. The liver was also hard in places. The cub's death was determined to be the result of insufficient oxygen to the liver. This was because the lungs were not fully developed, and consequently the lungs were unable to pick up oxygen for the red blood cells to deliver to the liver.

On March 30, 2013, veterinarians at the National Zoo artificially inseminated Mei Xiang after natural breeding failed to occur.  At approximately 5:30 p.m. local time on August 23, 2013, it was announced that Mei Xiang had given birth to her third cub. Mei Xiang gave birth again the following night, Saturday, August 24, 2013 to a stillborn cub, a female. The surviving cub was later revealed to also be female. She was later named Bao Bao ("treasure", colloquially meaning "baby") when she turned 100 days old. She lived at the zoo until February 21, 2017, when she moved to China.

In August 2015, veterinarians found what was believed to be a giant panda fetus on an obstetric ultrasound. She had been displaying behaviors consistent with a pregnancy or pseudopregnancy: spending more time in her den, sleeping more, cradling objects, and licking her body. She went on to give birth to two live male giant panda cubs, both fathered by Tian Tian. She gave birth to the first live cub at 5:35pm on August 22, 2015, and delivered the second, larger cub later that night at 10:07 PM On August 26, 2015, the National Zoo announced that the smaller of the two cubs had died. The surviving cub, who (like Bao Bao) was a high-profile birth for the zoo. On September 25, 2015, the cub was officially named Bei Bei, which means "precious, treasure."  The name was chosen by First Ladies Michelle Obama of the United States and Peng Liyuang of China. He lived at the zoo until November 19, 2019, when he moved to China.

In March 2020 shortly after the National Zoo closed due to the COVID-19 pandemic, Mei Xiang was artificially inseminated using only frozen sperm to avoid too much close contact. In August 2020, the National Zoo announced that Mei Xiang was pregnant. A few days after announcing that they had detected fetal tissue, the zoo tweeted a short video of an ultrasound showing a panda fetus. On August 21, Mei Xiang gave birth to a live male cub who was later named Xiao Qi Ji (English: Little Miracle), making her the oldest panda in the United States to give birth, at 22 years old. This meant the first success for this type of procedure.

References

External links
Giant Pandas at the National Zoo

Individual giant pandas
1998 animal births
National Zoological Park (United States)